Mogens Lüchow (13 May 1918 – 20 March 1989) was a Danish fencer. He competed in the individual and team épée events at the 1948 and 1952 Summer Olympics.

References

1918 births
1989 deaths
Danish male fencers
Olympic fencers of Denmark
Fencers at the 1948 Summer Olympics
Fencers at the 1952 Summer Olympics
Sportspeople from Copenhagen